Uğur Güneş may refer to:

 Uğur Güneş (volleyballer)
 Uğur Güneş (actor)